François de Suarez d'Aulan is a French aristocrat and businessman. He was married to the late Countess and Marchioness Sonia Czernin von und zu Chudentitz (house of Czernin). He notably owned the family-run champagne house Piper-Heidsieck, and was known as "The king of Champagne".

References

 François d'Aulan "Un fil dans le Tapis, histoire des Suarez d'Aulan", editions Karthala, Juin 2009,

External links

French businesspeople
Champagne producers
Living people
Year of birth missing (living people)